The Territory of White Deer is a Czechoslovak TV series.

The series was screened on Czechoslovak Television, on German ZDF, Super RTL and Kinderkanal and several times on Czech Television as well.

Plot
The story centers around a group of children, led by Leontinka (Zuzana Vejvodová) and Olda (Lukáš Jenčík). Father of Leontinka (Jan Kanyza) manages the local Deer Park with an invaluable breed of white deer. A series of mysterious events unfolds, threatening the deer. Leontinka and Olda, who is in turn a son of a local police officer (Pavel Zedníček), search for the villain. The list of suspects includes young fugitive (Michal Suchánek), former head of the deer park (Martin Růžek), former poacher (Jiří Sovák), manager of local restaurant (Oldřich Vlach), designer planning a motorway (Miroslav Etzler) and a couple of others. Stella Zázvorková performed a local widow, as well as Jana Hlaváčová, who works hard to repay financial debt the manager of restaurant. Ondřej Vetchý performed a lover of local teacher. Some parts of the story were narrated by Viktor Preiss (voiceover).

Episodes
 The Fugitive (Uprchlík)
 The Wildfire (Požár)
 The Secret Tunnel (Tajná chodba)
 The Poisoned Water (Otrávená voda)
 The Trip (Výlet)
 The New Forest (Nový les)
 The Capture (Dopadení)

Cast
Leontina Bajerová .... Zuzana Vejvodová
Olda .... Lukáš Jenčík
Honza .... Petr Čech
Pepa .... Robert Ježek
Mr. Bajer .... Jan Kanyza
Mr. Klepetka .... Pavel Zedníček
??? .... Michal Suchánek
Mr. Louš .... Martin Růžek
Mr. Roušar .... Jiří Sovák
Mrs. Kabátová .... Jana Hlaváčová
Teacher Arnošt .... Ondřej Vetchý
Narrator .... Viktor Preiss
Jaromír .... ???
Tractor Driver .... Vlastmil Bedrna
Waiter Kabát .... Oldřich Vlach
Mrs. Klepetková .... Dagmar Veškrnová-Havlová
Mr. Vašut .... Miroslav Etzler
Mrs. Javorská .... Simona Postlerová
Franta .... Blažej Svoboda
Eliška .... Adéla Stodolová
Helena .... Nora Kurzová
Mrs. Hlavíková .... Stella Zázvorková
Mr. Horáček .... Tomáš Valík
Mr. Verner .... Martin Zounar
Eva .... Miroslava Součková
Imre .... Miroslav Heyduk

Filming locations
Filming location included South Bohemian town Třeboň and Deer Park Žehušice near Kutná Hora.

External links
Record at Der Tschechisch-Slowakische FernsehSerienIndex - includes character names and episodes in German
 

1990s Czech television series
Czech action television series
Czech Television original programming